Patna–Ranchi AC Express is a fully air conditioned express train belonging to South Eastern Railway zone of Indian Railways that run between  and  in India.

Background
This line was inaugurated on 8 December 2018 as a seasonal line running Ranchi–Patna AC special train (No. 08623/24).

On 17 February 2019, this Special train was converted into Express train with new numbered 18633 / 34 and became the first weekly train running between the Patna and Ranchi corridor.

Service
The frequency of this train is weekly. It covers the distance of 424 km with an average speed of 41 km/hr.

Routes
This train passes through ,  &  on both sides.

Traction
As this route is electrified, a WAG-7 based loco pulls the train to its destination on both sides.

External links
 18633 Patna – Ranchi AC Express India Rail Info
 18634 Ranchi – Patna AC Express India Rail Info

References

Rail transport in Bihar
Rail transport in Jharkhand
Transport in Patna
Transport in Ranchi
AC Express (Indian Railways) trains